Dave Phillips may refer to:

Dave Phillips (ice hockey) (born 1987), British ice hockey player
Dave Phillips (umpire) (born 1943), American baseball umpire
Dave Benson Phillips (born 1967), British children's television presenter
Dave Phillips (maze designer) (born 1951), American maze designer
Dave Phillips (soccer) (born 1961), general manager of the Wichita Wings indoor soccer team

See also 
David Phillips (disambiguation)